Sigaus campestris is a species of short-horned grasshopper in the family Acrididae. it is found in New Zealand.

References

External links

 

Catantopinae